Micol may refer to

 Micol (given name), given name
 Giovanna Micol, Italian sports sailor